Muckleford is a small regional area in central Victoria, Australia. The area, also known as Wattle Flat, lies along the Muckleford Creek, a minor tributary of the Loddon River, approximately 127 kilometres north-west of the Melbourne city centre, and within the jurisdiction of the Mount Alexander Shire council. The nearest sizeable town is Castlemaine, approximately 7 km to the east. The original township is named after the English hamlet of the same name in Dorset, UK.

Geography
The region is characterised by gently undulating terrain featuring several farms and smaller rural properties. Formed over millions of years, the land contains many types of quartz sand, gravel and clay, with more fertile alluvial deposits along the Muckleford Creek valley. Muckleford Creek rises below Walmer and eventually flows into the Loddon River. For much of the year, the area experiences relatively dry conditions, more suited to sheep farming than dairying.

The land to the west of Muckleford is characterised by sparse eucalypt forest of box ironbark, some areas of which were mined for gold in during the 19th century. This western forest contains many remnants of the local mining history, including several open and covered mine shafts, and a poppet head which was part of the "Red White and Blue" mine.

Muckleford is crossed by several roads. Rilens Road, surfaced with yellow gravel, used to have a single raised telephone wire on wooden poles on its north side, which served local farms and houses. The road runs west from the Pyrenees Highway (Route B180), and crosses the Muckleford-Walmer Road, which runs north to south. It crosses the Muckleford Creek, and then passes through a thin eucalypt forest. Along the Muckleford-Walmer Road are several farms, a disused red brick church, and the Muckleford Cemetery.

The Pyrenees Highway connects Castlemaine to Newstead. The Maldon to Castlemaine road runs chiefly west to east, cutting through the Muckleford region. Adjacent to the Castlemaine Golf Club is the Castlemaine Steiner School and Kindergarten, which was founded in 1987.

There is no shopping centre in the town, and nearby Castlemaine serves the scattered farms, houses, and occasional rural commerce. Ten years later, in 2016, that number had fallen to 405 and the median age of the local population was 47 years.

History
The original inhabitants of the area were the Dja Dja Wurrung people, who followed a generally nomadic lifestyle. One of the first Europeans in the area was the explorer Major Thomas Mitchell, who travelled through in the spring of 1836 while undertaking the exploration of what he called "Australia Felix". Squatters arrived a few years later and established a handful of small "runs". Formal pastoral leases became available during the late 1840s.

The was no major development in the area until a series of small gold rushes occurred near Muckleford Creek and Wattle Flat in the early 1850s, and a small town quickly sprung up in the vicinity of the Maldon to Castlemaine Road and Muckleford Creek crossing. The town served the needs of the prospectors and speculators, and quickly rose to a population of over 2000 people. Within a year, there were hotels such as Monk's, Simson's and the Orrville to quench the thirst of the miners. A small Anglican school began to educate the children of the diggings. Located at North Muckleford, it remained open until 1877. in 1871, that school was replaced by a government primary school, South Muckleford State School (No 1124). Muckleford Post Office opened on 1 August 1857 and closed in 1966.

In 1884, Muckleford railway station was opened to the north of the township, on the Castlemaine to Maldon branch line. The station, along with a large goods shed, has been restored, and forms part of the Victorian Goldfields Railway. In early 2017, the railway was used at least twice a week, with a steam-hauled train stopping at Muckleford station. The service has become a major tourist attraction for the area.

For almost a decade before 2015, the area experienced severe drought conditions and some of the smaller creeks which fed the larger tributaries ran dry for several years.

Commerce and Local Facilities
The 18-hole golf course Castlemaine Golf Club is situated at the crossroads of Rilens Road and the Pyrenees Highway, with 9 holes on each side of the sealed road. The golf course is set in the natural bushlands, and the clubhouse is also available for functions.

In 1995, land was purchased on Rilens Road, near its intersection with the Pyrenees Highway, to establish the Castlemaine Steiner School and Kindergarten, catering for students from kindergarten to Year 8.

The Muckleford State Forest and recreation area incorporates mining relics, a picnic area, walking tracks, and native flora and fauna.

References

Web sites
https://whilewaitingforgodot.net/2017/06/26/muckleford-south-primary-school/ Muckleford State School
https://cartography.id.au/muckleford/muckleford.htm Muckleford Forest
https://www.monumentaustralia.org.au/themes/conflict/ww1/display/106030-south-muckleford-state-school-honour-roll/ Muckleford State School honour roll of the Great War